The Mitchell County School District is a public school district in Mitchell County, Georgia, United States, based in Camilla. It serves the communities of Baconton, Camilla, Meigs, Pelham, and Sale City.

Schools
The Mitchell County School District has one primary school, one elementary school, one middle school, and one high school.
Mitchell County Primary School

Elementary school
Mitchell County Elementary School

Middle school
Mitchell County Middle School

High school
Mitchell County High School

References

External links

School districts in Georgia (U.S. state)
Education in Mitchell County, Georgia